The network of railway lines in Western Australia associated with the timber and firewood industries is as old as the mainline railway system of the former Western Australian Government Railways system.

Timber railways
There is a range of terminology related to the timber railways - they have been known as logging railways, timber trams, and other names.  The dominant feature is the mobility or easiness of moving the lines from one area of forest to another - and in the early years the relatively primitive state of the lines.  The dominant feature is the narrow gauge, and lightness of the locomotives, relative to permanent railways.  In Western Australia, to allow for interchangeability of rail stock with the government rail system, a lot of the lines were  gauge, however the weight of the rails was usually much lighter than mainline steel.

Timber industry
The timber industry relied mostly upon the jarrah forests of the Darling Range and the karri forests of the Southwest Australia region.
       
It had stages of development, depending upon government policy and support.  The 1980s and the development of government railways assisted the industry, as well various levels of demand for jarrah and the other timbers. Also various labour issues in the industry, and external forces required re-thinking of the industry long before concern for over-logging and forest destruction in the later 21st century.

In many cases- timber/sawmilling/logging companies were family businesses, and as a consequence operations continued over time through family relationships, which in turn had effect on timber railway operations as well.

Timber companies

Millars Empire 
Jarrahdale Jarrah Forests and Railways Limited (Mill at Jarrahdale)
M. C. Davies Karri and Jarrah Company Limited (Mills at Karridale, Boranup and Jarrahdene)
Millars Karri and Jarrah Forests Limited (Mills at Denmark, Yarloop and Mornington Mills)
Canning Jarrah Timber Company
 Gill McDowell Jarrah Company (Mills at Waroona and Lion Mill)
 Jarrah Wood and Saw Mills Company
 Jarrah Timber and Wood Paving Corporation (Mills at Worsley)
 Imperial Jarrah Wood Corporation (Mills at Newlands and Quindalup)
 Swan Saw Mills
 Wilgarup Karri and Jarrah Company
 Sussex Timber company
 Bunning Brothers
 State Saw Mills, Pemberton
 Railway Department Mill, Banksiadale
Adelaide Timber company
 Kauri Timber Company
W.A. Timber Company
Perth Firewood Supply Company
Whites Mill/Honey and Company
Whittaker Brothers
Buckingham Brothers
Sexton and Drysdale/Vincent Brothers

Firewood industry (Goldfields woodlines) 

Kalgoorlie woodlines were lines that spread throughout the Eastern Goldfields of Western Australia - in all directions from the centre of the Kalgoorlie-Boulder region.  Commonly known as the woodlines they sustained a population of railway and timber workers in mainly temporary railway networks that moved regularly from the early twentieth century to the 1960s.

Companies 
The main companies were:
 The West Australian Goldfields Firewood Supply Ltd (WAGFS) formed in 1899 at Kurrawang and moved to Lakewood in 1937.
 The Lakewood Firewood Co. Pty. Ltd (LFC) which took over the WAGFS on 12 August 1948. The LFC was owned by a conglomeration of various firewood customers in the Kalgoorlie region. Operations ceased and the last train of firewood was delivered on 22 December 1964.
 The Kalgoorlie and Boulder Firewood Company formed in 1902 Broad Arrow later to Lakeside and part of the 1919 combine.
 The Westralia Timber and Firewood Company worked between 1902 -1920 at Kanowna later to Kurramia (aka B.T.Henderson's Tramway)
 The Lakeside Firewood Companies was the combination of the latter two businesses and existed for a short time between 1919 and 1924

Woodline strike 
A significant event in the woodlines history that affected the region was the industrial action that became the Woodline strike between 1 July through to 14 August 1919 over the attempt at post war reduction of wages for workers. The strike brought the goldmines of Kalgoorlie to a standstill as a result.

Publications 

The comprehensive coverage of the timber and firewood tramways in Western Australia is the publication in two editions:

 (1997 edition) 
 (2008 edition)

See also 
 Deforestation in Australia
 Forest railway
 Jarrah Forest
 Karri forest

Notes

Further reading 
 
 Fall, V. G. (1972) Cargoes of jarrah. History of the jarrah timber trade in W.A. and of the ships which carried jarrah cargoes. Includes a detailed account of one voyage of the Monkbarns. Early days, Vol. 7, pt. 4 (1972), p. 39-65
   Western Australian timber tramways - on Western Australia timber tramways published in Light Railways Nos 147 to 197, with a bibliography that included reference to:
 Austin, Jeff; "Timber Tramways of Lowden, Western Australia", Light Railways No.98, October 1987
 Austin, Jeff;. "Mill Railways at Claymore and Dellerton, Western Australia", Light Railways No. 107, January 1990
 Hambling, B.F. "Maurice Coleman Davies, Early Days", Journal & Proceedings of the Royal Western Australian Historical Society, Vol.6, Part 8, 1969
 Jessup,C.W. "Millar's Denmark Railway", Light Railways No.33, Spring 1970
 Watson, Lindsay. "The Perth Firewood Supply Company Ltd", Light Railways No.76, April 1982
 Woodland, E.W. "Decline of the Steam Locomotive on the Private Timber Lines in the South West of Western Australia". ARHS Bulletin No.297, July 1962
 Woodland, E.W. "The Jarrahdale Rockingham Excursion Trains", ARHS Bulletin No.318, April 1964

Railways
Railway lines in Western Australia
Timber companies of Western Australia
3 ft 6 in gauge railways in Australia
Narrow gauge railways in Australia
History of rail transport in Western Australia
Logging railways in Australia